Leiostyla degenerata is a species of land snail in the family Lauriidae. It is endemic to Porto Santo Island in the Madeira archipelago.

This snail is found only on the slopes of Pico Branco, a mountain on the island. Its entire known range measures about 3 by 2 kilometers. It lives with other Leiostyla species in leaf litter and rock cracks. The population, though small, is likely stable and there are no immediate threats.

References

Endemic fauna of Madeira
Molluscs of Madeira
Leiostyla
Gastropods described in 1886
Taxonomy articles created by Polbot